"The red rose cafe" is originally a Dutch language song, released in 1975, composed and written by the Dutch composer and singer Pierre Kartner, who recorded and performed most of his work under the stage name 'Vader Abraham' (father Abraham).

Cover versions of the song have been released by Peter Alexander (Germany), Joe Dassin (France), Mireille Mathieu (France), The Fureys (Ireland), Celtic Thunder (Ireland), Engelbert Humperdinck (UK), Audrey Landers (US), André Rieu (Netherlands), Jaromír Mayer (Czech Republic), Kantoři (Czech folk music) and Demis Roussos.

In the French language the song is called "Le café des trois colombes" and "Le vieux café de la Rue d'Amérique", in the German language "Die kleine Kneipe" and "Das kleine Beisl".

References

1975 singles
Dutch pop songs
English-language Dutch songs
Drinking songs
1975 songs
Songs written by Pierre Kartner